Briksdalsbreen is one of the most accessible and best known arms of the Jostedalsbreen glacier. Briksdalsbreen is located in the municipality of Stryn in Vestland county, Norway. It is located inside Jostedalsbreen National Park.

The size of Briksdalsbreen depends not only on temperature, but is also strongly affected by precipitation. Measurements since 1900 show small changes in the first decades, with advances in the glacier front in 1910 and 1929. The glacier attracted international attention in the 1990s, as it was growing at a time when other European glaciers were in decline.

After the year 2000, the glacier once again receded. In 2004 it had receded to  behind the lake outlet and in 2007 the glacier front was on dry land behind the lake. In this regard, its position approximated the situation in the 1960s. However, glaciologists speculate that the size of the glacier was at its smallest since the 13th century.

In 2008, the glacier front had only receded by  since the 2007 measurement. The slower melting is explained by the glacier being completely on dry land. The winter of 2007–2008 saw an increase in glacier mass, which was expected to move the glacier front forward around 2010. This was confirmed in the fall of 2010, when measurements showed that the glacier had advanced  over the last year This was however in comparison with the 2009 measurements, which saw the glacier being the most receded since measurements started in 1900.

As Briksdalsbreen is now very narrow at some stretches, it is possible that it will temporarily disconnect from the larger Jostedalsbreen.

Media gallery

References

External links

Useful Briksdalsbreen tourist site
Jostedalsbreen National Park Centre
Breheimsenteret
Official travel guide - Destination Stryn & Nordfjord
Directorate for Nature Management - National Parks
Sequence of photos showing the melting

Glaciers of Vestland
Stryn